Karl Erik Emanuel "Spänst" Svensson (also Eric; 10 September 1903 – 22 September 1986) was a Swedish athlete who specialized in the long jump and triple jump. In the long jump he finished eighth and fourth at the 1928 and 1932 Olympics, respectively. In the triple jump he won silver medals at the 1932 Olympics and 1934 European Championships.

Nationally Svensson won the long jump and triple jump titles in 1933 and held Swedish records in the triple jump (1931–48) and long jump (1934–59).

References

External links 

 

1903 births
1986 deaths
Athletes (track and field) at the 1928 Summer Olympics
Athletes (track and field) at the 1932 Summer Olympics
Swedish male long jumpers
Olympic athletes of Sweden
Olympic silver medalists for Sweden
Swedish male triple jumpers
European Athletics Championships medalists
Medalists at the 1932 Summer Olympics
Olympic silver medalists in athletics (track and field)
People from Jönköping
Sportspeople from Jönköping County